was a Japanese actor, voice actor and narrator who was represented by Aoni Production. Kōji Yada was also his birth name, but was written with different kanji . He died in Tokyo due to chronic kidney disease on May 1, 2014.

Notable voice roles

Anime television series
Star of the Giants (1969) (Jirō Masuda, Tsuneo Horiuchi)
Andersen Stories (1971) (Elen's Grandfather)
Getter Robo (1974) (Monji Ogarashi, Daizo Jin, Daimajin Yura)
Maeterlinck's Blue Bird: Tyltyl and Mytyl's Adventurous Journey (1980) (Tyltyl and Mytyl's Father, Spirit of the Time)
Fist of the North Star (1984) (Colonel, Hidora)
Yume Senshi Wingman (1984) (Kenta's Father)
Ginga: Nagareboshi Gin (1986) (Sniper, Daisuke's Father)
City Hunter '91 (1991) (Boss)
High School Mystery: Gakuen Nanafushigi (1991) (Shinichi Tajima)
Dragon Ball Z (1992) (#20/Dr. Gero)
21 Emon (1992) (Orino Masakazu)
A Dog of Flanders: My Patrasche (1992) (Bowman)
Aoki Densetsu Shoot! (1994) (Coach Matoba)
Dr. Slump (Remake) (1998) (Tsuruten)
Trouble Chocolate (1999) (Tetsusaburo Omori)
Crash B-Daman (2006) (Saionji Kurando)

Unknown date
Angel Heart (Chin)
Arrow Emblem Hawk of the Grand Prix (Narrator)
Bakuhatsu Goro (Onimaru)
Digimon Xros Wars (Deckerdramon)
Dragon Ball Z Kai (Dr. Gero)
Detective Conan:Magic Kaito Special (Konosuke Jii)
Dragon Ball GT (Dr. Gero)
GeGeGe no Kitarou 2nd Series (Konaki Jijii)
Getter Robo G (Professor Grah, Iron Armor Mask)
Hello! Lady Lynn (Headmaster)
Hanbun no Tsuki ga Noboru Sora (Yoshizou Tada)
High School Mystery: Gakuen Nanafushigi (Shinichi Tajima)
Jungle Kurobe (Shishi-otoko's Papa)
Lupin III Part III (Bruce)
Mazinger Z (Narrator, Professor Morimori, Pigman, Iron Mask)
Monster (Achmed Mustafa)
One Piece (Zeff, Raoul, Strong World Episode 0(Impel Down warden))
Rocky Chuck the Mountain Rat (Bob the Quail)
Saint Seiya (Libra Dohko (Roshi))
Space Battleship Yamato Series (General Talon)
Time Patrol Rescueman (Sandoitchi)

OVA
Garou Densetsu/Fatal Fury (xxxx) (Tung Fu Rue)
Legend of the Galactic Heroes (xxxx) (Sebastion von Musel)
Saint Seiya Hades Chapter (xxxx) (Roshi)

Movies
Dragon Ball Z: Extreme Battle! The Three Great Super Saiyajin (1992) (Dr. Gero)
Dragon Ball Z: The Strongest in the World (1990) (Dr. Kochin)
Farewell Space Battleship Yamato (xxxx) (General Talon)
Fist of the North Star (xxxx) (Colonel)
Kinnikuman Movies (xxxx):
Kinnikuman: Stolen Championship Belt (xxxx) (Mouko-Seijin)
Counterattack! The Underground Space Choujins (xxxx) (Hydra Būton)
Great Riot! Justice Superman (xxxx) (Black Great Ukon)
Hour of Triumph! Justice Superman (xxxx) (The Nio)
Justice Superman vs. Ancient Superman (xxxx) (Gun Satan)
Mazinger Z vs. Devilman (1972) (Professor Nossori)

Games
Dragon Ball Z 2: Super Battle (1995) (Dr. Gero / Android 20)  
Dead or Alive (1996) (Raidou)
JoJo's Bizarre Adventure: Phantom Blood (2006) (Dario Brando)
Klonoa (2008) (Grandpa)
Yakuza 4 (2010) (Yoshiharu Ueno)
Kid Icarus: Uprising (2012) (Dyntos)
unknown date
BS Fire Emblem: Akaneia Senki (xxxx) (Bore, Dice, and Buruzaku)
BS Zelda no Densetsu Inishie no Sekiban (xxxx) (Ajina)
Dragon Ball Z Series (xxxx-xx) (Dr. Gero)
Dragon Ball Z Sparking! (xxxx) Series (Dr. Gero)
 (xxxx) (Owner of the Inn, Photo Shop, Mr. Mamoru Mori, Muramoto, and Father T.)
Space Battleship Yamato Series (xxxx-xx) (General Talon)
Super Robot Wars Series (xxxx-xx) (Kevin Oruto)
Tokimeki Memorial Girl's Side: 2nd Kiss (xxxx-xx) (Souichirou Saeki)

Tokusatsu
Akumaizer 3 (xxxx) (voice of Evil)
Choujin Bibyun (xxxx) (voice of Evil)
Ganbare!! Robocon (xxxx) (voice of Robopar, Robo Mecha)
Robot Detective ((xxxx) voce of Seven man, voice of Spring man, voice of Gear man)
Sliver Mask (xxxx) (voice of Alien Shine)
Ultraman (1966) (voice of Underground People X)
Ultra Seven (1967) (voice of Alien Cool, voice of Alien Iyros, voice of AlienPoll, voice of Alien Goron)

References

External links
 
 

1933 births
2014 deaths
Aoni Production voice actors
Japanese male video game actors
Japanese male voice actors
Male voice actors from Tokyo
20th-century Japanese male actors
21st-century Japanese male actors